Kuwanaspidina is a subtribe of armored scale insects. They feed on bamboo.

Genera
Coronaspis MacGillivray, 1921
Kuwanaspis MacGillivray, 1921 Chuaspis is a junior synonym.
Medangaspis Takagi, 1999
Nikkoaspis Kuwana, 1928
Poliaspoides MacGillivray, 1921 moved from the obsolete Rugaspidiotina
Unachionaspis MacGillivray, 1921
Xiphuraspis Borchsenius & Williams, 1963

References

Diaspidini